The Constitution of the Republic of Croatia is promulgated by the Croatian Parliament.

History 
While it was part of the socialist Yugoslavia, the Socialist Republic of Croatia had its own Constitution under the Constitution of Yugoslavia.

Following the first multi-party parliamentary elections held in April 1990, the Parliament made various constitutional changes. On December 22, 1990, they rejected the communist one-party system, adopted a liberal-democratic constitution and dropped the 'Socialist' label from the country's name, becoming Republic of Croatia.
The document is sometimes known as the Christmas Constitution.

The Constitution was amended in early 1998.

The Constitution of 1990 used the semi-presidential model of the French Fifth Republic, with broad Presidential executive powers shared with the Government.

In 2000, and again in 2001, the Croatian Parliament amended the Constitution changing bicameral parliament back into historic unicameral and reducing the Presidential powers.

The Constitution was most recently amended in 2013. This constitutional amendment defines marriage within Croatia as a union between a man and a woman. Effective 1 January 2014.

Contents

Historical foundations 

This is the preamble of the Constitution. It explains how the Croats managed to preserve their national identity throughout centuries in various forms of states from the formation of Croatian principalities in 7th century until present days.

The millenary identity of the Croatian nation and the continuity of its statehood, confirmed by the course of its entire historical experience within different forms of states and by the preservation and growth of the idea of a national state, founded on the historical right of the Croatian nation to full sovereignty, manifested in:
the formation of Croatian principalities in the seventh century;
the independent mediaeval state of Croatia founded in the ninth century;
the Kingdom of the Croats established in the tenth century;
the preservation of the identity of the Croatian state in the Croatian-Hungarian personal union;
the independent and sovereign decision of the Croatian Parliament of 1527 to elect a king from the Habsburg dynasty;
the independent and sovereign decision of the Croatian Parliament of the Pragmatic Sanction of 1712;
the conclusions of the Croatian Parliament of 1848 regarding the restoration of the Triune Kingdom of Croatia under the authority of the ban grounded on the historical, national and natural right of the Croatian nation;
the Croatian–Hungarian Settlement of 1868 on the relations between the Kingdom of Dalmatia, Croatia and Slavonia and the Kingdom of Hungary, grounded on the legal traditions of both states and the Pragmatic Sanction of 1712;
the decision of the Croatian Parliament of 29 October 1918 to dissolve state relations between Croatia and Austria-Hungary and the simultaneous affiliation of independent Croatia, invoking its historical and natural right as a nation, with the state of Slovenes, Croats and Serbs, proclaimed on the former territory of the Habsburg monarchy;
the fact that the Croatian Parliament had never sanctioned the decision of the National Council of the State of Slovenes, Croats and Serbs to unite with Serbia and Montenegro in the Kingdom of Serbs, Croats and Slovenes (1 December 1918), subsequently (3 October 1929) proclaimed the Kingdom of Yugoslavia;
the establishment of the Home Rule (Banovina) of Croatia in 1939, by which Croatian state identity was restored within the Kingdom of Yugoslavia,
establishing the foundations of state sovereignty during the course of the Second World War, by the decisions of the Antifascist Council of National Liberation of Croatia (1943), as opposed to the proclamation of the Independent State of Croatia (1941), and subsequently in the Constitution of the People's Republic of Croatia (1947) and all later constitutions of the Socialist Republic of Croatia (1963–1990), on the threshold of the historical changes, marked by the collapse of the communist system and changes in the European international order, the Croatian nation by its freely expressed will at the first democratic elections (1990) reaffirmed its millenniary statehood. By the new Constitution of the Republic of Croatia (1990) and the victory in the Homeland War (1991–1995), the Croatian nation demonstrated its will and determination to establish and defend the Republic of Croatia as a free, independent, sovereign and democratic state.

Considering the presented historical facts and universally accepted principles of the modern world, as well as the inalienable and indivisible, non-transferable and nonexhaustible right of the Croatian nation to self-determination and state sovereignty, including its fully maintained right to secession and association, as basic provisions for peace and stability of the international order, the Republic of Croatia is established as the nation state of the Croatian people and the state of the members of autochthonous national minorities: Serbs, Czechs, Slovaks, Italians, Hungarians, Jews, Germans, Austrians, Ukrainians, Rusyns, Bosniaks, Slovenians, Montenegrins, Macedonians, Russians, Bulgarians, Poles, Roma, Romanians, Turks, Vlachs, Albanians and the others who are citizens, and who are guaranteed equality with citizens of Croatian nationality and the realization of national rights in accordance with the democratic norms of the United Nations Organization and the countries of the free world.
Respecting the will of the Croatian nation and all citizens, resolutely expressed in the free elections, the Republic of Croatia is hereby founded and shall develop as a sovereign and democratic state in which equality, freedoms and human rights are guaranteed and ensured, and their economic and cultural progress and social welfare promoted.

Basic provisions 

This chapter defines Croatia as unitary and indivisible democratic and social state in which power derives from the people and belongs to the people as a community of free and equal citizens. The people exercises this power through the election of representatives and through direct decision-making.

Article 3 states that freedom, equal rights, national equality and equality of genders, love of peace, social justice, respect for human rights, inviolability of ownership, conservation of nature and the environment, the rule of law, and a democratic multiparty system are the highest values of the constitutional order of the Republic of Croatia and the ground for interpretation of the Constitution.

Article 4 states that the government shall be organized on the principle of separation of powers into the legislative, executive and judicial branches, but limited by the right to local and regional self-government guaranteed by this Constitution.

Article 12 states that the official language is Croatian in the Latin script and that in some areas, together with the Croatian language and Latin script, other languages, such as Cyrillic or any other legal language can be used.

Protection of human rights and fundamental freedoms 

This chapter deals with general human rights, Personal and Political Freedoms and Rights and Economic, Social and Cultural Rights.

All are equal before the law regardless of race, color, gender, language, religion, political or other belief, national or social origin, property, birth, education, social status or other characteristics.

Article 21 states that every human being has the inalienable right to live, thus there is no capital punishment in the Republic of Croatia. Entrepreneurial and market freedom is the basis of the economic system. In this chapter Croatian National Bank is defined as central bank which is independent in its work of monetary policy making and responsible to the Croatian Parliament.

Organization of Government 

The Croatian parliament is defined as a representative body of the people and is vested with the legislative power. The most important function of the parliament is to make laws and to amend the Constitution.

The People's Ombudsman, as a commissioner of the Croatian Parliament, shall protect the constitutional and legal rights of citizens in proceedings before the state administration and bodies vested with public authority. He is elected by the parliament for a term of 8 years.

The President of the Republic of Croatia shall represent and stand for the Republic of Croatia at home and abroad. He shall take care of regular and harmonized functioning and stability of the state government and is responsible for the defense of independence and territorial integrity. He is elected directly by the people for a term of 5 years and is limited on 2 mandates maximum. The most important task of the President is to be Commander-in-Chief of the armed forces and to be leader during the state of war when he can issue decrees with the force of law. He is impeachable for any violation of the Constitution. Croatian parliament decides whether to proceed impeaching the President and that is decided by the Constitutional Court.

The Government of the Republic of Croatia exercise executive power. The Government consists of Prime Minister, one or more Deputy Prime Minister and ministers. President of the republic confides the mandate to form the Government to the person who, upon the distribution of the seats in the Croatian Parliament and consultations held, enjoys confidence of the majority of its members. The Government shall assume its duty if the vote of confidence is passed by a majority vote of all members of the Croatian Parliament.
The main function of the Government is to propose legislation, to execute laws, guide the foreign and internal policies, direct the state administration and take care of economic development. The Government is responsible to the Croatian parliament and parliament can vote of no confidence when Government resigns.

Judicial power is exercised by independent and autonomous courts. Supreme Court is the highest court and secures uniform application of laws and equal justice to all. The president of the Supreme Court is proposed by the President of the Republic and elected by the Croatian Parliament for a term of 4 years.
Judicial office is permanent. Judges are elected by the National Judicial Council. The National Judicial Council consists of 11 members elected by the Croatian Parliament from among notable judges, attorneys-at-law and university professors of law. The majority of members of the National Judicial Council shall be from the ranks of judges.

The Office of the Public Prosecutions is an autonomous and independent judicial body empowered and due to proceed against those who commit criminal and other punishable offences, to undertake legal measures for protection of the property of the Republic of Croatia and to provide legal remedies for protection of the Constitution and law. The Head Public Prosecutor of the Republic of Croatia shall be appointed by the Croatian Parliament at the proposal of the Government for a term of 4 years.

The Constitutional Court of the Republic of Croatia 

The Constitutional Court is not part of judicial system but the court sui generis. It consists of 13 judges elected by the Croatian parliament for a term of 8 years from among notable jurists, especially judges, public prosecutors, lawyers and university professors of law.

The main function of the Court is to decide on the conformity of laws and other regulation with the Constitution, to decide on jurisdictional disputes between the legislative, executive and judicial branches, to decide on the impeachment of the president of the republic, to supervise and ban political parties and to supervise the constitutionality and legality of elections and national referendums.

The Constitutional Court of the Republic of Croatia shall repeal a law if it finds it to be unconstitutional. When reviewing the legislation, the court often relies on the so-called Croatian constitutional identity and on the Croatian national identity.

Local and regional self-government 

Municipalities and towns are units of local self-government which carries out the affairs of local jurisdiction by which the needs of citizens are directly fulfilled, and in particular the affairs related to the organization of localities and housing, area and urban planning, public utilities, child care, social welfare, primary health services, education and elementary schools, culture, physical education and sports, customer protection, protection and improvement of the environment, fire protection and civil defense.

Counties are units of regional self-government which carries out the affairs of regional significance, and in particular the affairs related to education, health service, area and urban planning, economic development, traffic and traffic infrastructure and the development of network of educational, health, social and cultural institutions.

The capital city of Zagreb may be attributed the status of a county by law.

International relations 

International agreements are concluded depending on the nature and contents of the international agreement, within the authority of the Croatian Parliament, the President of the Republic and the Government of the Republic of Croatia. International agreements which entail the passage of amendment of laws, international agreements of military and political nature, and international agreements which financially commit the Republic of Croatia shall be subject to ratification by the Croatian Parliament. International agreements concluded and ratified in accordance with the Constitution and made public, and which are in force, shall be part of the internal legal order of the Republic of Croatia and shall be above law in terms of legal effects.

Procedure for the association of the Republic of Croatia into alliances with other states may be instituted by at least one-third of the representatives of the Croatian Parliament, the President of the Republic and the Government of the Republic of the Croatia. It is prohibited to initiate any procedure for the association of the Republic of Croatia into alliances with other states if such association leads, or might lead, to a renewal of a South Slav state community or to any Balkan state form of any kind. Any association of the Republic of Croatia shall first be decided upon by the Croatian Parliament by a two-thirds majority vote of all representatives. Any decision concerning the association of the Republic of Croatia shall be made on a referendum by a majority vote of the total number of electors in the State.

The provisions of this Article concerning association shall also relate to the conditions and procedure for the disassociation of the Republic of Croatia.

Amending the Constitution 

Amendments to the Constitution of the Republic of Croatia may be proposed by at least one-fifth of the members of the Croatian Parliament, the President of the Republic, the Government of the Republic of Croatia and by popular initiative, if valid signatures of 10% of the total number of voters are collected.

The decision to amend the Constitution shall be made by a two-thirds majority vote of all the members of the Croatian Parliament. In the case of popular initiative, a referendum is called and the Constitution can be amended even without majority vote in the Parliament.

See also
Constitutional Act on the Constitutional Court of the Republic of Croatia
Constitutional Act on the Rights of National Minorities in the Republic of Croatia

References 

 

1990 in law
Croatia
Law of Croatia